Daijee (English: Daijee) is a Bedkot Municipality in Kanchanpur District in Sudurpashchim Province of south-western Nepal. At the time of the 1991 Nepal census it had a population of 6597 people living in 2088 individual households.

Bedkot lake is one of the most famous destination and pilligrimage for Hindu religion. Bedkot lake is  situated 6 km north of Daijee. One more tourist attraction is Linga, people love to visit for picnic as well as for Shiva Darshan (Hindu's God). Linga is very close to Daijee Chauraha (about 5 km), on the way to Bedkot Lake. Besides this, Daijee is growing as a junction of connecting peoples from Bhitrimadesh (Dadeldhura) and Tarai belt.

References

daijee is the city of attraction..there are different religious places here .Bedkot lake ks one of the most popular destination sites here.

Populated places in Kanchanpur District